"They Don't Know" is a song by UK garage group So Solid Crew. It is the title track of their 2001 debut album and was released as the third single from the album on 5 November 2001. The song peaked at  3 on the UK Singles Chart, giving the group their second of five consecutive top-five hits.

Track listings
UK CD single
 "They Don't Know" (full length original version) – 5:10
 "Envy" (vocal remix featuring Da Twins and Ms. Dynamite) – 5:47
 "They Don't Know" (video)

UK 12-inch and cassette single
A. "They Don't Know" (full length original version) – 5:10
B. "Envy" (vocal remix featuring Da Twins and Ms. Dynamite) – 5:47

Charts

Weekly charts

Year-end charts

References

2001 songs
2001 singles
So Solid Crew songs
Relentless Records singles